Teemburra Dam was constructed in 1997 for town water storage and irrigation purposes. It is located approximately 50 km west of Mackay, Queensland. It has a surface area of 1,040 hectares, an average depth of 14.2 metres and holds 147,500 Ml.

Fishing
A Stocked Impoundment Permit is required to fish in the dam.

See also

List of dams and reservoirs in Australia

References

Reservoirs in Queensland
Dams completed in 1997
North Queensland
Dams in Queensland